The 2016 Montreal Alouettes season was the 50th season for the team in the Canadian Football League and their 62nd overall. The Alouettes finished the season in 3rd place in the East Division with a 7–11 record. Although this was a slight improvement upon their 6–12 record from 2015, it was still not good enough to get them back into the playoffs, as they lost the season series to the Hamilton Tiger-Cats (also 7–11) and thus, having to settle for 3rd place, behind the "crossover" team from the West, the Edmonton Eskimos (10–8). It was the first time the team missed the playoffs in back-to-back years since their reactivation.

Jim Popp returned as head coach for his second full season as head coach (his first being the 2007 season) and again led the Alouettes to another non-winning season. Popp also remained the team's general manager, a position he had held for the last 21 seasons since the team returned to Montreal in 1996. During the team's week 14 bye, Popp stepped down as head coach, and named receivers coach Jacques Chapdelaine as interim head coach for the remainder of the season. Popp remained with the team as their general manager.

Offseason

CFL draft
The 2016 CFL Draft took place on May 10, 2016. The Alouettes had eight selections in the eight-round draft, including the second overall pick, which was their highest pick since returning to the league in 1996.

Preseason 

 Games played with white uniforms.

Regular season

Standings

Schedule

 Games played with colour uniforms.
 Games played with white uniforms.
 Games played with alternate uniforms.

Team

Roster

Coaching staff

References

Montreal Alouettes seasons
2016 Canadian Football League season by team
Montreal Alouettes